Cosme de Villiers de Saint Étienne (1683–1758) was a French Carmelite bibliographer.

Life
Born in Saint-Denis, near Paris, he joined the Carmelite order and from 1709 to 1727 was lecturer in philosophy or theology in various convents of the order, particularly Nantes, Hennebont, and Saint-Pol-de-Léon. In 1727, Villiers began to preach. He later became a preacher in Orléans, where he died.

Works
He was the author of the Bibliotheca carmelitana (2 vols, Orleans, 1752).

References

Sources
Dictionnaire historique et bibliographique, vol. 2 (Paris, 1822), 64.
Dictionnaire historique; ou, Biographie universelle classique, vol. 6 (Paris, 1829), 3239.

1683 births
1758 deaths
18th-century French writers
18th-century French male writers
Carmelites
French bibliographers
Historians of monasticism
People from Saint-Denis, Seine-Saint-Denis